In mathematics, an acceptable ring is a generalization of an excellent ring, with the conditions about regular rings in the definition of an excellent ring replaced by conditions about Gorenstein rings.

All finite-dimensional Gorenstein rings are acceptable, as are all finitely generated algebras over acceptable rings and all localizations of acceptable rings.

References

Commutative algebra
Ring theory